KICY-FM is a commercial Christian contemporary music radio station in Nome, Alaska, broadcasting on 100.3 FM.

External links
KICY Website

Contemporary Christian radio stations in the United States
Nome, Alaska
Radio stations established in 1967
ICY-FM